Sphrantzes Palaiologos was a Byzantine aristocrat and commander active in the 1330s.

A member of the minor aristocracy and a Senator, in 1334 he was promised great rank and wealth by Emperor Andronikos III Palaiologos if he could capture or otherwise neutralise the renegade Syrgiannes Palaiologos. He posed as a deserter and entered the Serbian camp and killed Syrgiannes, who had deserted to King Stefan Dušan, ending his advance and bringing the Serbian army into disarray. Consequently, in August 1334, the king of Serbia made peace with Andronikos III Palaiologos and allowed his forces to retake control of captured parts of Macedonia.

He was rewarded with the high court rank of megas stratopedarches, which he held until his death of typhus in 1339, leading a campaign in Acarnania.

References

Sources
 
 
 

1339 deaths
14th-century Greek people
14th-century Byzantine people
Byzantine generals
Deaths from typhus
Megaloi stratopedarchai